The United States Federal Witness Protection Program (WPP), also known as the Witness Security Program or WITSEC, is a witness protection program codified through 18 U.S. Code § 3521 and administered by the United States Department of Justice and operated by the United States Marshals Service that is designed to protect threatened witnesses before, during, and after a trial.

A handful of states – California, Connecticut, Illinois, New York, and Texas – and Washington, D.C., have their own witness protection programs for crimes not covered by the federal program. The state-run programs provide less extensive protections than the federal program, in part because state governments lack the ability to issue federal documents, such as social security cards, verifying the new identity of protected witnesses.

History
The WITSEC program was formally established under Title V of the Organized Crime Control Act of 1970, which in turn sets out the manner in which the United States Attorney General may provide for the relocation and protection of a witness or potential witness of the federal or state government in an official proceeding concerning organized crime or other serious offenses. See 18 U.S.C.A 3521, et seq.  The federal government also gives grants to the states to enable them to provide similar services.

WITSEC was originally created as the Federal Witness Protection Program in the mid-1960s by Gerald Shur, when he was Attorney in Charge of the Intelligence and Special Services Unit of the Organized Crime and Racketeering Section of the United States Department of Justice.  Most witnesses are protected by the United States Marshals Service, while protection of incarcerated witnesses is the duty of the Federal Bureau of Prisons.

Former decorated federal law enforcement officer John Thomas Ambrose was convicted in 2009 of leaking information about a federal witness in the Witness Protection Program to Chicago Outfit hitman Nicholas Calabrese and other members of Chicago organized crime.

Operations
As of 2020, approximately 19,000 witnesses and family members have been protected by the U.S. Marshals Service since the program began in 1971.

According to Gerald Shur, who created the federal program, about 95% of witnesses in the program are "criminals". They may be intentional criminals, or people who are doing business with criminals, such as one engineer who bought off a mayor because that's how you do business in the city.' In his mind, he wasn't doing anything criminal," as Shur said. A witness who agrees to testify for the prosecution is generally eligible to join the program, which is entirely voluntary. Witnesses are permitted to leave the program and return to their original identities at any time, although this is discouraged by administrators.

In both criminal and civil matters involving protected witnesses, the U.S. Marshals cooperate fully with local law enforcement and court authorities to bring witnesses to justice or to have them fulfill their legal responsibilities.

Recidivism
Fewer than 17% of protected witnesses who have committed crimes are caught committing other crimes, compared to parolees, of whom almost 42% return to crime.

See also
 Witness immunity
 Witness Security Programme (Ireland)
 Witness tampering

References

Further reading 

 

United States, Federal
United States Department of Justice
United States Marshals Service

1970 establishments in the United States